Solignac-Le Vigen is a railway station serving Solignac and Le Vigen, Nouvelle-Aquitaine, France. The station opened on 1 July 1893 and is located on the Orléans–Montauban railway line. The station is served by TER (local) services operated by SNCF.

Train services
The following services currently call at Solignac-Le Vigen:
local service (TER Nouvelle-Aquitaine) Limoges - Uzerche - Brive-la-Gaillarde

References

Railway stations in France opened in 1893
Railway stations in Haute-Vienne